The Philadelphia Dance Company (also known as Philadanco) is a professional dance company based in Philadelphia, Pennsylvania, that specializes in contemporary dance. The organization was founded in 1970 by artistic director Joan Myers Brown. The company tours both nationally and internationally, in addition to their regular appearances locally at the Kimmel Center for the Performing Arts, the Painted Bride Art Center, and other venues in the Philadelphia area.  Part of the company's tour schedule is supported by the National Endowment for the Arts' Regional Arts Touring Program and the Pennsylvania Council on the Arts.

History
The Philadelphia Dance Company (Philadanco) was founded by Joan Myers Brown in 1970 to provide dance institution to African-American students who were not welcomed by other schools and dance academies.

Divisions
Philadanco conducts programs that are divided into four main components: the professional company, D/2 Apprentice Company, an Instruction and Training Program, and a Summer Training Program.

Professional Company 
The professional company of Philadanco is an internationally recognized modern dance company.  The company provides many performances throughout the year via domestic and international tours, and at their home theater, Philadelphia's Kimmel Center for the Performing Arts, during the months of fall and spring. Philadanco also established the International Association of Blacks in Dance (IABD), an organization that allows the black dance community to address common issues, pool their resources, and establish collaborations which result in beneficial advancements to the dance community as a whole.

D/2 
D/2 is the apprentice training company for Philadanco's professional company. It claims to provide unrivaled experience opportunities for young dancers who are not prepared to make the full transition to the world of professional dance. D/2 is under the instruction of Donald T. Lunsford, and when smaller organizations request a Philadanco performance, D/2 is able to fill the void that might have been left due to the professional company's hectic performance schedule.

Instruction and Training Program 
Philadanco's Instruction and Training Program is a forty-week experience, during which members attend classes with nationally recognized dance instructors. This program is the foundation of Philadanco's structure as it allows the young people of Philadelphia early and intense exposure to dance in the hopes that their talents will serve to raise the caliber of Philadanco's future apprentice and professional companies. Students receive training in numerous styles of dance including: ballet, jazz, African, tap, and specific modern techniques such as established by Katherine Dunham and Lester Horton. Their annual concert, “Danco on Danco” allows the students to demonstrate their dance and choreographic skills acquired through the Instruction and Training Program.

Summer Training Program 
Through the summer, Philadanco redirects its focus to preparing younger students for entry into the Instruction and Training Program. Although students from the Instruction and Training program commonly participate in both outlets, the summer program can act as an intense 'crash-course', providing insight to the rigors of a dancer's lifestyle. Training is provided in the three core genres of dance: ballet, jazz, and modern.

Repertory (Repertoire)
Philadanco's repertory includes numerous works from pioneers of modern dance such as Christopher Huggins and Jawole Willa Jo Zollar.  The professional company's original choreographies and choreographers have been inspiring mentors to other emerging companies in the area. The prevalence of these original works serve as a testament to Philadanco's artistic abilities as they have weathered the challenges faced by many Black modern dance companies. Below is a list of the pieces currently included in Philadanco's repertory:
	Back to Bach, by Eleo Pomare
	Ballet: The Blues and the Bible – Genesis, by Geoffrey Holder
	Between Earth and Home, by Jawole Willa Jo Zollar
	Blue, by Christopher L. Huggins
	Circular Ruins, by Elisa Monte
	Echoes: A Celebration of Alvin Ailey, by Milton Myers
	Elegy by Gene Hill Sagan
	Enemy Behind the Gates, Christopher Huggins
	Everything is Everything, by Lynne Taylor-Corbett
	For Mother, by Ronald K. Brown
	Forces of Rhythm, by Louis Johnson
	Gate Keepers, by Ronald K. Brown
	Hand Singing Songs, by Jawole Willa Jo Zollar
	Labess II, by David Brown
	My Science, by Bebe Miller
	Natural Flirt, by Trey McIntyre
	Steal Away, by Alonzo King
	Sweet in the Mornin, by Leni Wylliams
	Temple of my Listening, Eva M. Gholson
	Trance Atlantic, by Walter Nicks
	Xmas Philes, by Daniel Ezralow

Dancers
 Ja'Vonna Blake
 Elyse Browning
 Edward Gillis
 Allan Harmon
 Joy Heller
 Catherine Kreide
 Marlean Post
 Jasmine Powell
 Monica Rhea
 Anthony Silver
 Subira Taylor
 Kendal Williams

Community Outreach

In addition to providing dance education, Philadanco is an active participant in the arts community and a strong supporter of arts education. A few of the company's more notable accomplishments include
	Establishment of the International Association of Blacks in Dance (IABD).
	Being the pilot dance company to participate in the state of Pennsylvania's Comprehensive Education Training Act to create an arts training program.
	Providing an extension of The Philadelphia School of Dance Arts, and providing underprivileged dancers with opportunities for scholarships and work-study programs to ensure arts education to all.

References

External links
 Official Website of The Philadelphia Dance Company

1970 establishments in Pennsylvania
Culture of Philadelphia
Dance companies in the United States
Performing groups established in 1970
Organizations based in Philadelphia
Dance in Pennsylvania